Scirocco has been borne by at least two ships of the Italian Navy and may refer to:

 , a  launched in 1934 and sunk in 1942.
 , a  launched in 1982. 

Italian Navy ship names